Raymond Albert Kroc (October 5, 1902 – January 14, 1984) was an American businessman. He purchased the fast food company McDonald's in 1961 and was its CEO from 1967 to 1973. Kroc is credited with the global expansion of McDonald's, turning it into the most successful fast food corporation in the world by revenue.

Kroc was born in Oak Park, Illinois, and worked a variety of jobs, including as a paper cup salesman and a musician, before eventually becoming a milkshake mixer salesman. In 1954, he visited a hamburger restaurant in San Bernardino, California, owned by Richard and Maurice McDonald. Kroc was impressed with the efficiency and speed of the restaurant's operations, and he convinced the brothers to allow him to franchise the concept.

Under Kroc's leadership, McDonald's grew rapidly, and he implemented several key innovations, including the creation of a standardized menu and the development of a highly efficient assembly-line system for food preparation. Kroc also focused on aggressive expansion, opening new restaurants across the United States and eventually in other countries as well. He became the owner of McDonald's Corporation in 1961 and was credited as its founder.

After retiring from McDonald's, he owned the San Diego Padres of Major League Baseball (MLB) from 1974 until his death in 1984.

Early life
Kroc was born on October 5, 1902, in Oak Park, Illinois, near Chicago, to Czech-American parents, Rose Mary [née Hrach] (1881–1959) and Alois "Louis" Kroc (1879–1937). Alois was born in Horní Stupno, part of Břasy near Rokycany. Rose's father Vojtěch was from Ševětín and her maternal grandfather Josef Kotilínek was from Bořice. After immigrating to America, Alois made a fortune speculating on land during the 1920s, only to lose everything with the stock market crash in 1929.

During World War I, Kroc lied about his age and became a Red Cross ambulance driver at the age of 15, alongside Walt Disney.  The war ended shortly after he enlisted. During the Great Depression, Kroc worked a variety of jobs selling paper cups, as a real estate agent in Florida, and sometimes playing the piano in bands.

Developing and purchasing McDonald's

After World War II, Kroc found employment as a milkshake mixer salesman for the foodservice equipment manufacturer Prince Castle. When Prince Castle Multi-Mixer sales plummeted because of competition from lower-priced Hamilton Beach products, Kroc was impressed by Richard and Maurice McDonald, who had purchased eight of his Multi-Mixers for their San Bernardino, California restaurant, and visited them in 1954.

After finalizing a franchise agreement with the McDonald brothers, Kroc sent a letter to Walt Disney. They had met as ambulance attendant trainees at Old Greenwich, Connecticut during World War I. Kroc wrote, "I have very recently taken over the national franchise of the McDonald's system. I would like to inquire if there may be an opportunity for a McDonald's in your Disney Development". According to one account, Disney agreed but with a stipulation to increase the price of fries from ten cents to fifteen cents, allowing himself the profit. Kroc refused to gouge his loyal customers, leaving Disneyland to open without a McDonald's restaurant. Writer Eric Schlosser, writing in his book Fast Food Nation, believes that this is a doctored retelling of the transaction by some McDonald's marketing executives. Most probably, the proposal was returned without approval.

Kroc has been credited with making a number of innovative changes in the food-service franchise model. Chief among them was the sale of only single-store franchises instead of selling larger, territorial franchises which was common in the industry at the time. Kroc recognized that the sale of exclusive licenses for large markets was the quickest way for a franchisor to make money, but he also saw in the practice a loss in the franchisor's ability to exert control over the course and direction of a chain's development. Above all else, and in keeping with contractual obligations with the McDonald brothers, Kroc wanted uniformity in service and quality among all of the McDonald's locations. Without the ability to influence franchisees, Kroc knew that it would be difficult to achieve that goal. By granting a franchisee the right to only one store location at a time, Kroc retained for the franchise some measure of control over the franchisee, or at least those desiring to someday own the rights to another store.

Kroc's policies for McDonald's included establishing locations only in suburban areas; restaurants were not allowed to build in downtown and urban areas since more impoverished residents might break in and enter after the main business hours were over. Restaurants were to be kept properly sanitized at all times, and the staff must be clean, properly groomed and polite to children. The food was to be of a strictly fixed, standardized content and restaurants were not allowed to deviate from specifications in any way. There was to be no waste of anything, Kroc insisted; every condiment container was to be scraped completely clean. No cigarette machines or pinball games were allowed in any McDonald's.

During the 1960s, a wave of new fast food chains appeared that copied McDonald's model, including Burger King, Burger Chef, Arby's, KFC, and Hardee's. Kroc became frustrated with the McDonald brothers' desire to maintain a small number of restaurants. The brothers also consistently told Kroc he could not make changes to things such as the original blueprint, but despite Kroc's pleas, the brothers never sent any formal letters that legally allowed the changes in the chain. In 1961, he bought the company for $2.7 million, calculated so as to ensure each brother received $1 million after taxes. Obtaining the funds for the buyout was difficult due to existing debt from expansion. However, Harry Sonneborn, whom Kroc referred to as his "financial wizard", was able to raise the required funds.

At the closing, Kroc became annoyed that the brothers would not transfer to him the real estate and rights to the original San Bernardino location. The brothers had told Kroc they were giving the operation, property and all, to the founding employees. In his anger, Kroc later opened a new McDonald's restaurant near the original McDonald's, which had been renamed "The Big M" because the brothers had neglected to retain rights to the name. "The Big M" closed six years later. It is alleged that as part of the buyout Kroc promised, based on a handshake agreement, to continue the annual 1% royalty of the original agreement, but there is no evidence of this beyond a claim by a nephew of the McDonald brothers. Neither of the brothers publicly expressed disappointment over the deal. Speaking to someone about the buyout, Richard McDonald reportedly said that he had no regrets.

Kroc maintained the assembly line "Speedee Service System" for hamburger preparation that was introduced by the McDonald brothers in 1948. He standardized operations, ensuring every burger would taste the same in every restaurant. He set strict rules for franchisees on how the food was to be made, portion sizes, cooking methods and times, and packaging. Kroc also rejected cost-cutting measures like using soybean filler in the hamburger patties. These strict rules also were applied to customer service standards with such mandates that money be refunded to clients whose orders were not correct or to customers who had to wait more than five minutes for their food.

By the time of Kroc's death, the chain had 7,500 outlets in the United States and in 31 other countries and territories. The total system-wide sales of its restaurants were more than $8 billion in 1983, and his personal fortune amounted to some $600 million.

Baseball
Kroc retired from running McDonald's in 1973.  While he was looking for new challenges, he decided to return to baseball, his lifelong favorite sport, when he learned that the San Diego Padres were for sale. The team had been conditionally sold to Joseph Danzansky, a Washington, D.C. grocery-chain owner, who planned to move the Padres to Washington. However, the sale was tied up in lawsuits when Kroc purchased the team for $12 million, keeping the team in San Diego. In Kroc's first year of ownership in 1974, the Padres lost 102 games, yet drew over one million in attendance, the standard of box office success in the major leagues during that era. Their previous top attendance was 644,772 in 1972. The San Diego Union said Kroc was "above all, a fan of his team".

On April 9, 1974, while the Padres were on the brink of losing a 9–5 decision to the Houston Astros in the season opener at San Diego Stadium, Kroc took the public address microphone in front of 39,083 fans. "I've never seen such stupid ballplaying in my life," he said. The crowd cheered in approval. In 1979, Kroc's public interest in future free agent players Graig Nettles and Joe Morgan drew a $100,000 fine from Commissioner Bowie Kuhn. Frustrated with the team, he handed over operations of the team to his son-in-law, Ballard Smith. "There's more future in hamburgers than baseball," Kroc said.

After his death, the Padres in 1984 wore a special patch with Kroc's initials, RAK. They won the NL pennant that year and played in the 1984 World Series, which they lost to the Detroit Tigers. Kroc was inducted posthumously as part of the inaugural class of the San Diego Padres Hall of Fame in 1999.

Personal life
The Kroc Foundation supported research, treatment and education about various medical conditions, such as alcoholism, diabetes, arthritis and multiple sclerosis. It is best known for establishing the Ronald McDonald House, a nonprofit organization that provides free housing for parents close to medical facilities where their children are receiving treatment.

In 1973, Kroc received the Golden Plate Award of the American Academy of Achievement.

A lifelong Republican, Kroc believed firmly in self-reliance and staunchly opposed government welfare and the New Deal. Kroc donated $255,000 to Richard Nixon's reelection campaign in 1972, and was controversially accused by some, notably Senator Harrison Williams, of making the donation to influence Nixon to veto a minimum wage bill making its way through Congress.

Kroc's first two marriages to Ethel Fleming (1922–1961) and Jane Dobbins Green (1963–1968) ended in divorce. Kroc and Fleming met in 1919 and soon fell in love before getting married in 1922, then moving to Chicago, Illinois. They welcomed their daughter Marilyn in 1924. His third wife, Joan Kroc, was a philanthropist who significantly increased her charitable contributions after Kroc's death. She donated to a variety of causes that interested her, such as the promotion of peace and nuclear nonproliferation. Upon her death in 2003, her remaining $2.7 billion estate was distributed among a number of nonprofit organizations, including $1.5 billion donation to The Salvation Army to build 26 Kroc Centers, along with a $200 million donation to National Public Radio as she believed deeply in the power of public radio. In addition to that, she also donated to community centers serving underserved neighborhoods, throughout the country.

Death 
In 1980, following a stroke, he entered an alcohol rehabilitation facility. He died four years later of heart failure at a hospital in San Diego, California, on January 14, 1984, at the age of 81, and was buried at the El Camino Memorial Park in Sorrento Valley, San Diego.

In popular culture
Kroc's acquisition of the McDonald's franchise as well as his "Kroc-style" business tactics are the subject of Mark Knopfler's 2004 song "Boom, Like That".

Kroc co-authored the book Grinding It Out, first published in 1977 and reissued in 2016; it served as the basis for a biographical movie about Kroc.

Michael Keaton portrayed Kroc in the 2016 John Lee Hancock film The Founder. The film's depiction of Kroc's franchise development, nationwide expansion, and ultimate acquisition of McDonald's, offered a critical view of his treatment of the founding McDonald brothers.

Kroc is featured in the documentary series The Food That Built America on the History channel.

Kroc is featured in Tim Harford's BBC World Service radio show 50 Things That Made the Modern Economy in the episode, "Fast food franchise", which depicts the boom that his franchisee model provided for the fast food industry.

See also
 List of ambulance drivers during World War I
 History of McDonald's
 Den Fujita

References

Further reading
 
 Byers, Paula K., and Suzanne M. Bourgion (eds.). (1997). Encyclopedia of World Biography. Detroit: Gale Research. . s.v. "Kroc, Raymond."
 
 
 
 
 
 
 
 Biography: Ray Kroc, Fast Food McMillionaire (1998) video

External links
 
 
 
 TIME Magazine profile
  "Flying Baseballs"

1902 births
1984 deaths
20th-century American businesspeople
American chief executives of food industry companies
American people of Czech descent
Philanthropists from Illinois
American real estate businesspeople
American Red Cross personnel
American restaurateurs
American salespeople
Businesspeople from Illinois
Businesspeople from San Diego
California Republicans
Fast-food chain founders
Illinois Republicans
McDonald's people
People from Oak Park, Illinois
San Diego Padres owners
20th-century American philanthropists